Ritalinic acid is a substituted phenethylamine and an inactive major metabolite of the psychostimulant drugs methylphenidate and ethylphenidate. When administered orally, methylphenidate is extensively metabolized in the liver by hydrolysis of the ester group yielding ritalinic acid. The hydrolysis was found to be catalyzed by carboxylesterase 1 (CES1).

Etymologically, ritalinic acid shares its roots with Ritalin, a common brand name for methylphenidate.

Uses
Ritalinic acid is used as an intermediate in the synthesis of methylphenidate and its analogues, such as ethylphenidate and isopropylphenidate.

References

External links 
 Ritalinic acid on PubChem

2-Benzylpiperidines
Methylphenidate
2-Piperidinyl compounds